Gordon Brown (11 February 1885 – 12 January 1967) was an Australian politician who served as a Senator for Queensland from 1932 to 1965, representing the Australian Labor Party (ALP). He was President of the Senate from 1943 to 1951.

Early life
Brown was born on 11 February 1885, in Chesterfield, Derbyshire, England. He was the son of Jane (née Woodcock) and William Brown; his father was a bootmaker and Methodist lay preacher. Brown attended Clay Cross Grammar School on a scholarship and was then apprenticed to a patternmaker at a steam-engine manufacturing company. He had a "restless disposition" and also briefly worked as a piano salesman and in a coal mine in the north of England. He was a member of the Social Democratic Federation where he was "steeped in Marxian theory".

Canada
In 1908, Brown moved to Canada where he became involved with the Socialist Party of Canada. He later recalled his first major political speech as a three-hour address in Victoria, British Columbia. He stood unsuccessfully for the House of Commons in Victoria City at the 1911 federal election. Brown became disillusioned with the movement's lack of success and doctrinaire nature. He was briefly imprisoned for street agitation, and subsequently returned to England.

Move to Australia

Brown arrived in Sydney in 1912, and within a few months was president of the Sydney branch of the Australasian Socialist Party. Shortly after he was arrested for illegal public speaking in Wollongong. He and a friend walked to Brisbane in April 1913, where he was again gaoled for speaking without a permit. He married Beatrice Agnes Hinchsliff in 1914, with whom he had three children. Brown became the organising secretary of the Brisbane branch of the Socialist Party, and was a regular contributor to The International Socialist. By 1917 he was involved with the Industrial Workers of the World, travelling around Queensland giving speeches. His activities drew the attention of the Commonwealth Investigation Branch, which reported that he was involved with "the worst revolutionary elements of Brisbane". He applied for a passport to travel to Russia and study Bolshevism, but was refused.

In the lead-up to the 1917 conscription plebiscite, Brown was employed as an organiser by the Anti-Conscription Campaign Committee. His radicalism waned, and he later found work as an agent for the Metropolitan Life Insurance Company and as a salesman for Finney Isles and Co., a furniture and drapery firm. He joined the Shop Assistants' Union, serving as an organiser and vice-president, and from 1925 to 1927 served as vice-president of the Trades and Labour Council of Queensland.

Politics

Brown joined the Australian Labor Party (ALP) in 1918 and was elected to the Senate at the 1931 federal election, to a term beginning on 1 July 1932. He served as Chairman of Committees from 1941 to 1943. On 23 September 1943, he was elected President of the Senate, succeeding the late Senator James Cunningham. He remained President until 19 March 1951, when the Liberal Party took control of the Senate and elected Ted Mattner to replace him. He retired in 1964, taking effect in 1965.

From 1947 to 1950, he and Joe Collings were the joint Fathers of the Senate, and from 1950 until his retirement, Brown was the sole Father. He suffered a stroke in July 1951 while speaking on the Constitution Alteration (Powers to Deal with Communists and Communism) Bill, causing him to slump across his desk. However, he made a full recovery and served for another fourteen years, retiring on 30 June 1965 at the age of 80.

Later life 
Brown published his memoirs, My Descent from Soapbox to Senate, in 1953.

He died on Thursday 12 January 1967 at Royal Brisbane Hospital. A state funeral was held on Saturday 14 January 1967 at St Philip's Anglican Church in Annerley and then the East Chapel of Mount Thompson Crematorium. His ashes are kept in the church's columbarium.

References

Further reading 

 
 

Australian Labor Party members of the Parliament of Australia
Members of the Australian Senate for Queensland
Members of the Australian Senate
1885 births
1967 deaths
20th-century Australian politicians
Australian trade unionists
Australian socialists
Australian Marxists
Socialist Party of Canada candidates in the 1911 Canadian federal election
British expatriates in Canada
British emigrants to Australia